Maria Costa may refer to:

 Maria Costa (poet) (1926–2016), Italian poet
 Maria Costa (gymnast) (born 1998), Portuguese rhythmic gymnast
 Maria Costa (actress), seen in Dangerous Minds
 Maria da Costa (born 1931), Olympic freestyle swimmer from Brazil
 Maria Della Costa (1926–2015), Brazilian actress and producer
 Maria Ludovica Costa, Italian rower